Thomas Urwin may refer to:

 Thomas Urwin (politician) (1912–1985), British Labour politician
 Thomas Urwin (footballer) (1896–1968), England international footballer

See also
Thomas Irwin (disambiguation)